Gerald Keith Bouey,  (April 2, 1920 – February 6, 2004) was the fourth Governor of the Bank of Canada from 1973 to 1987, succeeding Louis Rasminsky. He was succeeded by John Crow.

Born in Axford, Saskatchewan, Bouey earned an Honours Bachelor of Arts in Economics at Queen's University. During the Second World War, he served with the Royal Canadian Air Force, attaining the rank of flight lieutenant.  In 1948 Bouey joined the Bank of Canada Research Department and became Assistant Chief in 1953, Deputy Chief in 1956 and Chief of Research in 1962. Bouey became  Advisor to the Governor in 1965, Deputy Governor in 1969, Senior Deputy Governor in 1972, and Governor in 1973. In 1981, he was made an Officer of the Order of Canada and promoted to Companion in 1987. His wife is Anne, and they had two children, Kathryn and Robert.

References

External links

 Gerald Keith Bouey  at The Canadian Encyclopedia

1920 births
2004 deaths
Companions of the Order of Canada
Governors of the Bank of Canada
Members of the United Church of Canada
Businesspeople from Ottawa
Businesspeople from Saskatchewan
Queen's University at Kingston alumni